The United States Girls' Junior Championship is one of the thirteen U.S. national golf championships organized by the United States Golf Association. It is open to amateur girls who are under 19 on the last day of the competition and have a USGA handicap index of 9.4 or less. It consists of two days of stroke play, with the leading 64 competitors then playing a match play competition to decide the champion.
 
The inaugural championship was held in 1949 and was won by Marlene Bauer from a field of 28 entries.

Aree Wongluekiet, now Aree Song, is the youngest winner at 13 years, 99 days in 1999. Hollis Stacy is the only three-time winner of the tournament.

Winners

Multiple winners
3 wins: Hollis Stacy
2 wins: Judy Eller, Nancy Lopez, Seong Eun-jeong

Future sites

Banden Dunes Golf Resort is slated to host in 2035 and 2045.
Oakland Hills Country Club is slated to host in 2038.

Source

See also
 U.S. Junior Amateur Golf Championship, the analogous event for boys

References and notes

External links

Amateur golf tournaments in the United States
Women's golf tournaments in the United States
Junior golf tournaments
Girls' Junior Golf Championship